Sniježnica is a village in the municipality of Teočak, Bosnia and Herzegovina. It is located east of Sniježnica Lake.

Demographics 
According to the 2013 census, its population was 1,690.

References

Populated places in Teočak